The Port of Cleveland is a bulk freight and container shipping port at the mouth of the Cuyahoga River on Lake Erie in Cleveland, Ohio, United States.  It is the third-largest port in the Great Lakes and the fourth-largest Great Lakes port by annual tonnage. Over 20,000 jobs and $3.5 billion in annual economic activity are tied to the roughly 13 million tons of cargo that move through Cleveland Harbor each year. 

The Port of Cleveland is the only container port on the Great Lakes, with bi-weekly service between Cleveland and Antwerp on a service called the Cleveland-Europe Express.

Cargo 
The Port of Cleveland handles the bulk of raw material shipments for regional manufacturing, as well as exporting some local resources (salt mined from under Lake Erie, materials quarried locally, Ohio farm surpluses).

Primary Cargoes 
Inbound: Steel, heavy machinery, iron ore, limestone, liquid/dry bulk
Outbound: Steel, iron ore, limestone, cement, salt, and machinery

Overall Annual Tonnage 
Generating $3.5 billion per year in trade.
Annual cargo handling averages between 11 million to 16 million tons
Dry Bulk (loose materials such as limestone and grain): 12 million tons
Break Bulk (packaged materials): 500,000 tons
about 1,000 vessel visits,

Connections

Rail 
Connections to:
(2) Class I railroads:
CSX Transportation
Norfolk Southern Railway
and several regional/short-line railroads:
Cleveland Terminal and Valley Railway
Cleveland Works Railway
Cuyahoga Valley Railway
Flats Industrial Railroad
ISG Railways
Newburgh and South Shore Railroad
R.J. Corman Railroad/Cleveland Line
Wheeling and Lake Erie Railway

Truck 
Port has truck access to four major Interstate highways:
I-71, South to: Strongsville, Seville, Columbus and Cincinnati
I-77, South to: Akron, Canton, Richfield, Cambridge, Marietta; Beckley, West Virginia and Columbia, South Carolina
I-80/Ohio Turnpike,
East to: Streetsboro, Youngstown; and Pennsylvania Turnpike
West to: North Ridgeville, Lorain, Toledo; and Indiana Toll Road
I-90,
East to: Euclid, Ohio, Willoughby; Erie, Pennsylvania and Buffalo, New York
West to: Westlake, Elyria, Toledo; and South Bend, Indiana
as well as local bypasses/connectors:
I-271, I-480, and I-490;
and Ohio State Routes, such as:
Ohio State Route 2
East to: Euclid and Painesville
West to: Rocky River and Elyria

Facilities 

Geography 
The Port of Cleveland spans across the Cleveland Harbor on Lake Erie and up the Cuyahoga River to the turning basin.

Maritime 

Operators 
Four terminal operators use port facilities:
 Carmeuse NA
 Essroc (Italcementi)
 Kenmore Construction
Federal Marine Terminals, Inc.

Cleveland Bulk Terminal 
Cleveland Bulk Terminal (CBT), located at 5500 Whiskey Island Drive, on Whiskey Island, is port-owned but operated by Carmeuse NA which handles iron ore transfers.  The lakefront facility can accommodate  vessels used to discharge and reload rail cars.  The automated CBT iron ore loader system on Whiskey Island on the west side of the Cuyahoga River loads materials onto boats from the terminal and transfers materials at a rate of 5,200 tons per hour. Limited handling of materials greatly improves the quality of pellets delivered to the mill.
The ore loader operation benefits three Cleveland companies:
Cleveland-Cliffs—supplier of iron ore pellets
Mittal Steel Company—uses the pellets at its mills
 Carmeuse NA—CBT operator and materials transporter

Terminals 
These facilities are:
nine berths and docks in either open dock or two-berth facilities
capacity for lifting up to 150 net tons
direct rail access and warehousing ability
 of warehouse space and
 of open storage for general cargo operations.

Foreign Trade Zones 
Cleveland-Cuyahoga County Port Authority, Grantee #40, operates-owns several General Purpose Zone Foreign Trade Zones in Cuyahoga County, Ashtabula County and Lorain County.

Port of Cleveland 
Port of Cleveland complex located on Lake Erie at the mouth of the Cuyahoga River includes five general cargo facilities operated by port-approved stevedoring contractors.

Tow Path Valley Business Park 
Tow Path Valley Business Park is located on both sides of the east and west bank of the Cuyahoga River bordered by Jennings Road on the south, Upper Campbell Road on the east, I-490/I-77/Dille Road on the north and West 14th Street to the west.

See also 
List of North American ports
List of ports in the United States

Notes

References

Other sources 

 

Economy of Cleveland
Geography of Cleveland
Cleveland
River ports of the United States
Transportation in Cleveland
Port authorities in the United States
Foreign trade zones of the United States
Lake Erie